Rainy Lake Falls is a waterfall on the inlet stream of namesake Rainy Lake in Chelan County, Washington.

A steep talus cascade is also found at the foot of the falls. Rainy Lake's outlet stream eventually flows into the Stehekin River.

The drainage area of Rainy Lake Falls is very small, but its sources allow it to retain water all year long, with best flows from May through August. It is located alongside the North Cascades Highway.

References

Landforms of Chelan County, Washington
Waterfalls of Washington (state)
North Cascades of Washington (state)